Maharaja Chhatrasal Station Chhatarpur railway station is located in Chhatarpur district of Madhya Pradesh and serves Chhatarpur city. Its code is "MCSC". Passenger, Express, and Superfast trains halt here.

Trains

The following trains halt at Maharaja Chhatrasal Station Chhatarpur railway station in both directions:

 Gita Jayanti Express
 Dr. Ambedkar Nagar - Prayagraj Express
 Bhopal - Khajuraho Mahamana Superfast Express
 Khajuraho - Virangana Lakshmibai Passenger

References

Railway stations in Chhatarpur district
Jhansi railway division